Mahmoud Khamees Al-Hammadi (born 28 October 1987) is an association football player from the United Arab Emirates who plays as a defender for Al-Wahda.

Club career

International career
He made his debut in a friendly defeat to Benin in November 2007, playing the entire game. He was included into the 2011 AFC Asian Cup squad, made his debut in the match against Iraq for only 16 minutes as the UAE lost 0–1 in injury time.

He scored his first international goal against Lebanon in the third round of 2014 FIFA World Cup qualification, but the UAE lost 1–3 and eventually failed to qualify for the 2014 FIFA World Cup. It took him a decade before he scored his second international goal, a 3–2 win over Vietnam in the 2022 FIFA World Cup qualification, which sent both teams into the Third Round.

Goals

References

External links
 

1987 births
Living people
Emirati footballers
United Arab Emirates international footballers
Al Wahda FC players
Al-Nasr SC (Dubai) players
2011 AFC Asian Cup players
UAE Pro League players
Association football fullbacks